Ben Hur is a 2003 animated drama film based on the 1880 novel Ben-Hur: A Tale of the Christ, by Lew Wallace. It is the fourth film adaptation of the novel following the 1907 silent short film, the 1925 silent film, and the Academy Award-winning 1959 film.

Charlton Heston's production company, Agamemnon Films (in association with GoodTimes Entertainment), produced this direct-to-video animated version of the story, with Heston himself reprising his role as the title character. It would prove to be his final film role before his death in 2008.

Synopsis
The animated version tells the same story as the 1959 film, with some differences. The story begins with Balthazar waiting in the desert for the two other wise men for a journey to Bethlehem. The story of Ben-Hur begins 30 years after the birth of Christ.

In contrast to the 1925 and 1959 versions, the face of Jesus is shown and his words are heard in this film.

The character of Messala is different from the 1959 film. Appearing lame, he approaches Ben-Hur for forgiveness, and joins Ben-Hur's family and Balthazar to witness the passion of Jesus. Ben-Hur gives water to Jesus on the way to Calvary. As Jesus dies, Ben-Hur and his family, with Balthazar, Messala, and  Esther, clasp their hands in prayer. Miracles occur when Jesus heals Ben-Hur's family of leprosy, and enables Messala to walk again. He comes near the cross thanking Jesus for the miracle.

At the film's end, Mary Magdalene sees Jesus emerge from the tomb and he ascends into heaven, giving the promise to the apostles to preach the gospel. Ben-Hur, now married to Esther, shares with his children his story and faith in Jesus.

Voice cast
 Charlton Heston as Judah Ben-Hur
 Scott McNeil as Jesus, Number 59, Art Instructor
 Gerard Plunkett as Pontius Pilate, Mystic, Bystander #2
 Duncan Fraser as Messala, Melchior, Herod Antipas, Innkeeper, Bystander #1
 Tabitha St. Germain as Miriam, Woman, Young Woman, Woman #2
 Kathleen Barr as Esther, Female Angel, Mary Magdalene, Woman #1
 Willow Johnson as Tirzah, Mary
 Long John Baldry as Balthazer, Roman Captain, Roman Citizen, Leading Soldier, Citizen
 French Tickner as Gaspar, Jewish Man, Doctor
 Dale Wilson as Sheik Ilderim, Angel Gabriel, Scientist
 Mackenzie Gray as Rabbi, Priest, Soldier #1
 Richard Newman as Quintus Arrius, Shepherd #1, Merchant
 Ian James Corlett as Gesius, Andrew, Another Man
 Michael Dobson as Joseph, Soldier #2
 Lee Tockar as Judas, Shepherd #2, Guard, Slave
 Rob Court as Peter, Man, Leper
 Russell Roberts as Roman Merchant, Archery Instructor
 William Samples as Roman Soldier

References

External links

 
 
 

2003 direct-to-video films
2003 animated films
GoodTimes Entertainment
Films about Christianity
Christian animation
Portrayals of Jesus in film
Portrayals of the Virgin Mary in film
Cultural depictions of Judas Iscariot
Cultural depictions of Pontius Pilate
Ben-Hur films
Animated films based on novels
Canadian animated feature films
Canadian direct-to-video films
2003 drama films
2003 films
2000s English-language films
2000s Canadian films